Maheshwari Girls' School is a girls' school located at Rabindra Sarani, Kolkata, West Bengal, India. The school offers up to 10+2 standard of education. The school is affiliated to ICSE and ISC.

See also
Education in India
List of schools in India
Education in West Bengal

References

External links 
 

Girls' schools in Kolkata
1986 establishments in West Bengal
Educational institutions established in 1986